Moana Lynore Mackey (born 28 February 1974) is a New Zealand politician and has represented the New Zealand Labour Party in the New Zealand Parliament from 2003 until 2014.  She has Māori, Irish, Scottish and Spanish ancestry.

Early life and career 
Born in Auckland, New Zealand and raised in Gisborne, Mackey attended Mangapapa Primary School, Ilminster Intermediate and Lytton High School. While in high school, Mackey would participate in Young Labour, the New Zealand Youth Orchestra and Youth Parliament. After leaving high school, she attended Victoria University of Wellington from 1993, graduating with a degree in biochemistry and molecular biology. Remaining in the Wellington area, she worked as a scientist, leading a team at an environmental laboratory in Lower Hutt and from 2001 to 2004 was a member of the Petone Community Board.

From 1999 to 2000, Moana Mackey served as President of Young Labour. She also worked in the Trade Union movement.

Member of Parliament 

Mackey entered Parliament on 29 July 2003 through the Labour party list after Graham Kelly vacated his list seat. Her mother, Janet Mackey, also sat as a Labour MP until 2005 – the two formed the first mother-daughter pair in New Zealand parliamentary history. In the election that year, Janet Mackey retired from politics, and Moana Mackey contested but lost the East Coast electorate seat (formerly held by her mother) to National Party candidate, Anne Tolley by 1219 votes. However, she returned to Parliament as a List MP. Mackey unsuccessfully contested East Coast again in the 2008 general election, losing to National's Anne Tolley by 6,413 votes. Mackey again returned to Parliament as a list MP for the Labour Party.

Mackey was not placed high enough on Labour's list to return to Parliament following the  election to be allocated a seat following a drop in support for Labour. In February 2017, Labour list MP Jacinda Ardern won the 2017 Mount Albert by-election, which allowed the party to bring a new list MP to parliament. Mackey was the second-highest ranked Labour candidate not to enter parliament at the 2014 election. The person higher, Maryan Street, announced she would decline the chance to return to Parliament. Mackey likewise declined the option to re-enter Parliament.

Post politics 
Since 2015 Mackey has been employed in several advisory roles in Wellington City Council's city planning team.

Notes

References

Further reading 

 Parliamentary biography Retrieved 17 April 2008.

1974 births
Living people
New Zealand biochemists
New Zealand Labour Party MPs
New Zealand people of Irish descent
New Zealand people of Scottish descent
New Zealand people of Spanish descent
People from Gisborne, New Zealand
Victoria University of Wellington alumni
Women members of the New Zealand House of Representatives
Māori MPs
Local politicians in New Zealand
New Zealand trade unionists
New Zealand list MPs
Members of the New Zealand House of Representatives
Women biochemists
New Zealand women chemists
Women molecular biologists
Unsuccessful candidates in the 2002 New Zealand general election
Unsuccessful candidates in the 2014 New Zealand general election
New Zealand molecular biologists
21st-century New Zealand politicians
21st-century New Zealand women politicians